The 2010–11 Duquesne Dukes men's basketball team represented Duquesne University in the 2010–11 NCAA Division I men's basketball season. The Dukes, led by head coach Ron Everhart, played their home games at the A.J. Palumbo Center and CONSOL Energy Center in Pittsburgh, Pennsylvania, as members of the Atlantic 10 Conference. Duquesne started the year with a 16–5 record, the program's best start since the 1971–72 season, and won their first eight conference games for the first time ever. However, they ended the regular season losing six of their last eight games.

The Dukes finished fourth in the A-10 during the regular season, but were upset in the quarterfinals of the Atlantic 10 tournament by the 12th-seeded , ending their tournament run after just one game.

Duquesne failed to qualify for the NCAA tournament, but were invited to the 2011 College Basketball Invitational. The Dukes won their first game in the tournament, but were eliminated in the quarterfinals of the CBI after losing to eventual tournament champion Oregon, 77–75.

Roster 

Source

Schedule and results

|-
!colspan=9 style=|Exhibition

|-
!colspan=9 style=|Regular season

|-
!colspan=9 style=| Atlantic 10 tournament

|-
!colspan=9 style=| CBI

Source

References

Duquesne Dukes men's basketball seasons
Duquesne
Duquesne
Duquesne men's basketball
Duquesne men's basketball